Bosmie-l'Aiguille is a commune in the Haute-Vienne department in the Nouvelle-Aquitaine region in western France. Inhabitants are known as Bosmiauds in French.

Geography
The river Briance forms all of the commune's north-eastern border, then flows into the Vienne, which forms part of its northern border. L'Aiguille station has rail connections to Bordeaux, Périgueux, Brive-la-Gaillarde and Limoges.

See also
Communes of the Haute-Vienne department

References

Communes of Haute-Vienne